HMS Ottringham was one of 93 ships of the  of inshore minesweepers.

Their names were all chosen from villages ending in -ham. The minesweeper was named after Ottringham in the East Riding of Yorkshire.

In 1959, the ship was sold to the Royal Ghana Navy.

References

Ham-class minesweepers
Ships built in Scotland
1958 ships
Cold War minesweepers of the United Kingdom
Royal Navy ship names
Ham-class minesweepers of the Ghana Navy